Small Miracles may refer to:

 Small Miracles (book series), series of inspirational books by Yitta Halberstam and Judith Leventhal
 Small Miracles (album), 2007 album by Blue Rodeo

See also
 Small Miracle, 1934 film